Dead money can refer to:

 Dead money (poker), a poker term
 Global saving glut, a situation in which desired saving exceeds desired investment
 Dead Money, a downloadable content pack for the video game Fallout: New Vegas